The Fiat 521 is a passenger car produced by Fiat between 1928 and 1931. The 521 was derived from its predecessor model, the Fiat 520, but with a bigger engine and chassis. The 521C was a shorter variant. This car was produced outside Italy, most notably at the Fiat-NSU plant in Heilbronn, starting in 1930, setting Fiat on the path to its subsequent multinational status.

More than 33,000 Fiat 521s were produced in Italy and Germany.

Further reading

521
Cars introduced in 1928
1930s cars